Klaus Oldendorff (14 April 1933 – 17 March 2003) was a German sailor. He competed in the Dragon event at the 1968 Summer Olympics.

References

External links
 

1933 births
2003 deaths
German male sailors (sport)
Olympic sailors of West Germany
Sailors at the 1968 Summer Olympics – Dragon
Sportspeople from Lübeck